The 1946–47 SM-sarja season was the 16th season of the SM-sarja, the top level of ice hockey in Finland. Nine teams participated in the league, and Ilves Tampere won the championship.

Regular season

Final
 Ilves Tampere - Tarmo Hämeenlinna 10:2

External links
 Season on hockeyarchives.info

Liiga seasons
Fin
1946–47 in Finnish ice hockey
1947 in Finnish sport